The Gundohinus Gospels is a medieval codex of c.a. CE 754 that is located in the Bibliothèque Municipale at Autun, France. This artifact consists primarily of the Four Gospels and contains a variety of medieval artistic illustrations / depictions including decorated initials, Roman influenced pillars surrounding canon tables, a Maiestas Domini illustration, and four Evangelists portraits.

The Maiestas Domini Illustration 
Contained within the Gundohinus Gospels is a miniature of the Maiestas Domini. The subject matter of this page has been described as having a larger centered circle or roundel with four smaller circles or medallions located around the center, as if to form a rectangular type of box frame. In the center circle is a depiction of Christ, seated on a throne while holding a book in one hand and offered the sign of peace or blessing with the other. Standing on either side of Christ are angels with one hand each upon the throne of Christ and eyes focused on intently onto him. Within the four corner medallions are four "beasts" that portray representations of the four Evangelists. In the upper left corner is the Man of Matthew, the upper right corner being the Lion of Mark, the lower left corner depicts the Bull of Luke, while the lower right corner symbolizes the Eagle of John.

Decorated Initials 

Throughout the Gundohinus Gospels, there are a number of decorated initials that appear either as capital letters or as majuscule script, and are largely composed of animals or beast-like creatures - making up the lines or curvature of the letter being illustrated. One example of this style (shown to the left) is through the use of a bird to indicate the side of the letter "C". It is thought that this style has its origination with Roman scriptoria and can be seen in other 8th-Century Merovingian manuscripts.

Canon Tables 

The Gundohinus Gospels contains twelve pages of canon tables which were meant to be used to determine which religious passages were shared within which of the Four Gospels. The canon tables (shown to the right) are framed with Roman style pillars or columns with four concentric arches - one over each of the four gospels. The open spaces of the arches are filled with illustrations of leaves and vines, while the columns themselves contain repetitive designs flowing vertically of either geometric shapes or curved scroll like artistry.  Unlike the decorated initials previously noted, it does not appear that the use of animals or beasts appear anywhere on the framework surrounding the gospels nor within the script of the gospel citations themselves.

Portraits of the Four Evangelists 

Relevant to the gospels contained within, the Gundohinus Gospels also contains portrait type depictions of the four Evangelists; Matthew, Mark, Luke, and John. Noteworthy is the fact that of all of the surviving Merovingian types of manuscripts, the Gundohinus Gospels is the only such religious document that provides "full-page" portraits of these evangelists. This adds to the uniqueness of the Gundohinus Gospels in regards to other such religious or other manuscripts of the medieval time period. From an iconic figural perspective, those these portraits are part of a work created in the mid-700's CE, their depiction can be compared against that of later era Carolingian empire artistic representations.

References 

750s
8th century in Francia